NGC 1222 is an early-type lenticular galaxy located in the constellation of Eridanus. The galaxy was discovered on 5 December 1883 by the French astronomer Édouard Stephan. John Louis Emil Dreyer, the compiler of the New General Catalogue, described it as a "pretty faint, small, round nebula" and noted the presence of a "very faint star" superposed on the galaxy.

NGC 1222's morphological type of S0− would suggest that it should have a mostly smooth profile and a very dull appearance. However, the galaxy was imaged by the Hubble Space Telescope in 2016, and the image showed that there were several bright blue star forming regions, as well as dark reddish areas of interstellar dust. NGC 1222 is currently interacting with and swallowing two dwarf galaxies that are supplying the gas and dust needed to become a starburst galaxy.

See also
NGC 1275, another starburst galaxy

References

External links
 

1222
011774
Lenticular galaxies
Starburst galaxies
Peculiar galaxies
Eridanus (constellation)
Discoveries by Édouard Stephan